Parliamentary elections were held in Djibouti on 22 February 2013. After their boycott of the 2008 elections, opposition groups contested the elections as the Union for National Safety alliance.

According to government figures, the ruling Union for the Presidential Majority won 55 of 65 seats in Parliament, while the USN won the remaining 10 seats. It was the first time since independence in 1977 that opposition parties had been represented in the legislature. However, the USN claimed the figures for Djibouti city were falsified and released alternative results which would have reduced the UMP to 34 seats and increased their total from 10 to 31.

Electoral system
In 2013 the previous winner-takes-all party block vote was abandoned. Instead the elections were held using closed list systems in which 80% of seats (rounded to the nearest integer) in each constituency were awarded to the party receiving the most votes. The remaining seats were allocated proportionally to other parties receiving over 10% of the vote using the D'Hondt method. In cases where no other party received more than 10% of the vote, all seats in a constituency were awarded to the party receiving the most votes.

Results

By region

Aftermath
On 26 February 2013, UNS spokesman Daher Ahmed Farah said police fired tear gas on demonstrators that were protesting the election results. 300 people were arrested. "The situation is tense," Farah said. "The opposition won the elections and the victory was denied... the numbers were manipulated." The National Assembly began meeting for its new parliamentary term on 18 March 2013. Idriss Arnaoud Ali was re-elected without opposition as President of the National Assembly. 10 opposition deputies were not present.

References

Elections in Djibouti
Djibouti
Parliamentary
Djibouti